Goromonzi High School is a secondary school located in Goromonzi, Mashonaland East Province, Zimbabwe.

History
The school was established in 1946 as the first boarding school for black students. The school may have formerly been a boys school and later changed to accommodate females students. It is located 35 kilometers from the Zimbabwean capital Harare, along the Harare-Mutare Road.

Academics
Subjects offered include Mathematics, English Language & Literature, Sciences, Accounts, Practical Subjects such as Agriculture, Woodwork, Fashion and Fabrics, Home Economics, Shona, Technical Graphics, computer studies, biology, physics, chemistry.

Extracurricular activities 
Social clubs: Entertainment Committee, Interact Club, Scripture Union, Toastmasters Club & Leo Club

Chess 
In chess Goromonzi High lifted the Harare Schools Chess league in 2014 under the leadership of the school's legend, the first ever to play for the school in Europe, Anesu Gwezere with the help of Kudzaishe Manyanya with a fide rating of 1800 the best rating in the country for his age group. The school has also produced other talented players in the form of Panashe Munemo and Panashe Gatsi who also lifted the schools chess league in 2014 alongside the aforementioned legends. Chess is certainly their strongest point though basketball is the school's main sport which has produced many great players in the national team like Marshall Gwezere and Tinotenda Nyanhete to mention just a few.

Athletics
Goromonzi has an array of sports including with facilities for Rugby, Soccer, Netball, Volleyball, Basketball, Tennis, Table Tennis, Cricket, Athletics, swimming and other interest activities. In recent years the school has been the best in Mashonaland East. In 2010 the under 20 boys basketball team made it to the nationals but fell short to Churchill High School.

See also

List of boarding schools
List of secondary schools in Mashonaland East

Notable alumni 

 Tendai Biti, Zimbabwean minister of finance
 Aeneas Chigwedere, educator, historian, and politician
Tizirai Gwata, physician and politician; first black mayor of Harare
 Sarah Kachingwe, activist and politician
 Christopher Kuruneri, businessman, lawyer, and politician
 Simon Mazorodze, physician and politician
 David Phiri, businessman
 Dr Beth Chitekwe-Biti, Planner and urban development activist. Current Managing Director of Slum Dwellers International
 Admire Taguma Musingarabwi, politician, philanthropist
 Tm

References

External links

Co-educational schools in Zimbabwe
Boarding schools in Zimbabwe
High schools in Zimbabwe
Buildings and structures in Mashonaland East Province
Education in Mashonaland East Province
Educational institutions established in 1946
1946 establishments in Southern Rhodesia